Ryan A. Reed (born August 12, 1993) is an American professional stock car racing driver and driver coach who previously competed part-time in the NASCAR Camping World Truck Series. Reed previously competed full-time in the NASCAR Xfinity Series with Roush Fenway Racing for five years, driving the No. 16 Ford Mustang, which was highlighted by two wins (in 2015 and 2017) at the season-opening Daytona race. He has also competed in the ARCA/CRA Super Series in the past. After Roush closed down their Xfinity Series team after the 2018 season, Reed has mostly been without a ride in NASCAR since then. While in that situation, Reed has worked since 2020 as the driver coach for Jack Wood, who competes for GMS Racing in the ARCA Menards Series.

Racing career

Early career
Reed began racing at age 4, and in 2009 won the Legends Division championship at Irwindale Speedway. In 2010, he entered the Super Late Model Division, and became the track's youngest Super Late Model winner, and won Rookie of the Year. At age 17, Reed moved from Bakersfield, California to Mooresville, North Carolina to focus on racing. In 2011, Reed ran in various series, including the Pro Allstars Series, Whelen All-American Series and the K&N Pro Series East. During the year, Reed was expected to run a Late Model as a development driver with Kyle Busch Motorsports until his diagnosis with type 1 diabetes. In December 2011, Reed was announced as a part-time driver in the ARCA Racing Series for Venturini Motorsports. Reed ran 14 events in the team's No. 15, recording six top tens and a 14th-place points finish. In 2012, Reed made his NASCAR Camping World Truck Series debut at Las Vegas Motor Speedway in the No. 5 for Wauters Motorsports, finishing 17th.

2013–2018: Roush Fenway Racing

In 2013, Reed joined Roush Fenway Racing in the Nationwide Series, driving No. 16 Ford Mustang, and running various races during the 2013 season with Eli Lilly and Company and the American Diabetes Association's Drive to Stop Diabetes campaign as sponsor. Reed made his Nationwide debut in the ToyotaCare 250 at Richmond International Raceway, finishing 16th. Reed ran six races during the season, recording his first top-ten after finishing 9th in the Virginia 529 College Savings 250 at Richmond. On October 11, 2013, Roush Fenway Racing announced that Reed would run the No. 16 in the 2014 NASCAR Nationwide Series season full-time, with Lilly Diabetes and the ADA sponsoring full-time. The sponsorship has been reported to be worth $5 million annually.

On February 21, 2015, Reed won his first Xfinity Series race in the season-opening Alert Today Florida 300 at Daytona International Speedway, pushed by teammate Chris Buescher past leader Brad Keselowski on the final lap of the race. On June 20, 2015, Reed won his first career ARCA Racing Series race in the Scott 150 at Chicagoland Speedway driving for Lira Motorsports. Reed led the final 70 laps of the 100-lap race, capturing the Valvoline Lap Leader award. It was the first ARCA Series win for Lira Motorsports. Reed ended the 2015 Xfinity season a distant 10th in points, the Daytona victory being his only top 10 of the year. 

Reed ran the full Xfinity season in 2016. In early 2016, Reed attempted the Truck race at Daytona driving the No. 58 Ford F-150 for Lira Motorsports, but failed to qualify. In 2016, Reed finished with 7 top 10s, increasing his total top 10 count from 3 to 10. Reed finished 6th in points.

On September 28, 2016, it was announced by RFR that Reed would attempt his Sprint Cup Series debut at Talladega in the Hellmann's 500, driving the No. 99 Ford Fusion. Reed became the first driver in NASCAR to manage his diabetes and race in the Sprint Cup Series. After starting 18th, he finished 26th.

On February 25, 2017, Reed won the Xfinity Series' season-opening race, the PowerShares QQQ 300, at Daytona. His second career Xfinity Series victory, Reed survived a race that eliminated multiple drivers in wrecks, with only ten cars of the field of forty having little to no damage.  At the June Michigan race weekend, Reed substituted for Trevor Bayne in the No. 6 Cup car during practice as Bayne's wife, Ashton, was expecting their second child.

On October 15, 2018, it was announced that longtime sponsor Lilly Diabetes would be pulling out of the sport, with Roush eventually shutting down their entire Xfinity program at season's end due to lack of sponsorship.

2019–present
After starting the season without a ride, Reed joined DGR-Crosley's No. 17 team in the Truck Series for the 2019 spring race at Las Vegas, where he finished ninth. However, he did not end up attempting any more races with them or any other team in any NASCAR series for the rest of the year. However, he returned to compete in some late model races on occasion, returning to the Wauters Motorsports No. 5 team. In 2020, Reed was without a ride again. For the time being, he was announced to serve as a driver coach for Velocity Racing in the ARCA Menards Series West with their No. 78 team and driver Jack Wood, who is also from California like Reed. In 2021, Reed returned to the driver's seat for the first time in two years when he competed in the Truck Series race at Richmond in the No. 49 for CMI Motorsports. Team owner Ray Ciccarelli was originally going to drive the truck in the race, but after the team did qualify for it based on which other teams entered the race as part of the lack of qualifying due to COVID-19, Ciccarelli stepped aside in favor of Reed in an effort to get the team passed Norm Benning's No. 6 in the owner points, which would likely lock the No. 49 into future races they entered. On May 3, 2021, it was announced that Reed would join GMS Racing to drive their No. 24 at Darlington, after that truck's normal driver, Raphaël Lessard, struggled to find sponsorship and as a result was taken out of the ride.

Personal life
Reed's father, Mark Reed, is a former NASCAR driver who has two K&N West wins and two Cup starts. Reed is the youngest of four children.

In February 2011, Reed was diagnosed with type 1 diabetes, and doctors stated he would be unable to race again. As a result, Reed became a diabetes advocate, and established the foundation Ryan's Mission. Reed installed a drink system in his car, along with a blood glucose monitor on the car's dashboard which displays data from a wireless device attached to Reed's stomach. During races, Reed would monitor his blood glucose levels, while Roush engine tuner Craig Herrmann would inject Reed with insulin during pit stops. Reed is one of three drivers in a national racing series with type 1 diabetes, along with IndyCar Series drivers Charlie Kimball and Conor Daly.

Motorsports career results

Career summary

NASCAR
(key) (Bold – Pole position awarded by qualifying time. Italics – Pole position earned by points standings or practice time. * – Most laps led.)

Sprint Cup Series

Xfinity Series

Camping World Truck Series

 Season still in progress 
 Ineligible for series points

K&N Pro Series East

K&N Pro Series West

ARCA Racing Series
(key) (Bold – Pole position awarded by qualifying time. Italics – Pole position earned by points standings or practice time. * – Most laps led.)

See also
 List of people with diabetes mellitus type 1

References

External links

 

Living people
1993 births
Racing drivers from Bakersfield, California
ARCA Menards Series drivers
NASCAR drivers
People with type 1 diabetes
RFK Racing drivers